José Luis Hernández Martínez (born October 10, 1994, in Tlalpan, Mexico City) is a Mexican professional footballer who plays for Gavilanes de Matamoros of Liga Premier de México.

Notes

External links
 
 

Living people
1994 births
Mexican footballers
Association football defenders
Cimarrones de Sonora players
Ascenso MX players
Footballers from Mexico City